The National Basketball League Coach of the Year Award was an annual National Basketball League (NBL) award given to the top head coach of the regular season in each of the twelve years the league existed. The Coach of the Year was selected by sports writers, broadcasters, coaches, and managers.

Among the winners were three future Basketball Hall of Famers: Al Cervi (1985), Les Harrison (1980), and Bobby McDermott (1988).

Winners

See also
 NBA Coach of the Year Award

References

Coach
Awards established in 1938
1938 establishments in the United States